John George Hess (November 3, 1838 – February 27, 1915) was an Ontario businessman and political figure. He represented Perth North in the Legislative Assembly of Ontario as a Conservative from 1883 to 1890.

He was born in Beerfelden, Germany in 1838, the son of Jacob Hess and Anne Marie Seip, and came to Canada West with his family in 1858, settling in Berlin (later Kitchener, Ontario). He married Elizabeth Hueffner in 1860. Hess manufactured furniture. He served on the town council and was mayor of Listowel in 1883. Hess was defeated when he ran for reelection in 1891. In 1893, he was named customs collector for Stratford.

References

External links
 

1838 births
People from Beerfelden
Progressive Conservative Party of Ontario MPPs
Mayors of places in Ontario
German emigrants to Canada
1915 deaths